Oktay Vural (born 9 February 1956) is a Turkish politician, lawyer and former bureaucrat.

Oktay Vural was born on February 9, 1956, in  Diyarbakır  as the child of Hasan and Harbiye Vural. After completing his primary and secondary education in Diyarbakır, he graduated from  Istanbul University  Faculty of Law in 1979 . In 1983, he received his Master's Degree from  Ege University  , Faculty of Economics, Department of Finance, and in 1987, his PhD in Economics from Dokuz Eylul University, Institute of Social Sciences.

In 1988, he became an Assistant Professor at  Dokuz Eylül University , Faculty of Economics and Administrative Sciences. BOTAŞ Pipelines and Petrol Transport Inc. Chairman of the Board of Directors and General Manager, Member of the Presidency State Audit Board, Türkiye Gübre Sanayi A.Ş. Chairman of the Board of Directors and General Directorate, Unity in Democracy Foundation Membership, NATO Parliamentary Assembly Membership, XXI., XXIII., XXIV and XXV. He served as the İzmir Deputy for the term, as the chairman of the Parliamentary Industry, Trade, Energy, Natural Resources, Information and Technology Commission, and as the Minister of Transport. He served as the Deputy Chairman of the Nationalist Movement Party (MHP) Group in the 23rd and 24th term in the Grand National Assembly of Turkey. He resigned from his position on 22 June 2016  

Galatasarayis a congress member. He had two children named Oğuz and Yavuz from his marriage to Tuba Vural.

References

External links
 Official Website

1956 births
Living people
People from Diyarbakır
Members of the 25th Parliament of Turkey
Members of the 24th Parliament of Turkey
Members of the 23rd Parliament of Turkey
Members of the 21st Parliament of Turkey
Members of the 26th Parliament of Turkey
Istanbul University Faculty of Law alumni